The 1961 World Modern Pentathlon Championships were held in Moscow, Soviet Union.

Medal summary

Men's events

Medal table

See also
 World Modern Pentathlon Championships

References

Modern pentathlon in Europe
World Modern Pentathlon Championship
World Modern Pentathlon Championship, 1961
International sports competitions hosted by the Soviet Union
Sports competitions in Moscow